Chōsen gakkō are schools located in Japan at which children from Korean communities in Japan receive their ethnic-centric heritage education.

Chōsen gakkō are foreign schools for children of Korean communities in Japan.

As of 2013, there were 73 grade schools and ten high schools in Japan. As of 2014, there were about 150,000 Zainichi Koreans in Japan, and they form the clientele of the schools. As of 2013, these schools had almost 9,000 ethnic Korean students.

There is also a university in Japan, Korea University.

History

The schools were established in Japan by Koreans and people of Korean descent. The schools received increasing support from the Korean communities in Japan in the 1950s and 1960s.

Beginning in 2010 and by 2014, increasing tensions between the Japanese and North Korean governments caused Japanese municipalities and prefectures to end subsidies to the Chōsen gakkō. In the fiscal year of 2011 the Osaka Prefectural Government ended subsidies to an educational corporation which operates ten Chōsen gakkō.

The Japanese central government also took measures against the Chōsen gakkō. In 2010 it prevented the high schools from being a part of a tuition free waiver program. In February 2013 the Japanese central government, citing the development of the North Korean nuclear program and a lack of cooperation regarding the North Korean abductions of Japanese citizens, officially declared that Chōsen gakkō may not be a part of the tuition waiver program.

On May 17, 2013, the United Nations Economic and Social Council released a report citing "The Committee is concerned at the exclusion of Korean schools from the State party’s tuition-waiver programme for high school education, which constitutes discrimination. (art. 13, 14)"

Lawsuits have been launched throughout Japan against these unfair treatments against Chōsen gakkō students as discrimination based on ethnic origin and heritage.

Schools 

 Aichi Prefecture
 Aichi Korean Middle and High School (愛知朝鮮中高級学校)
  (愛知朝鮮第七初級学校)
  (名古屋朝鮮初級学校)
  (東春朝鮮初級学校) - Formerly had junior high school classes
  (豊橋朝鮮初級学校)
 Chiba Prefecture
 Chiba Korean Primary and Junior High School (千葉朝鮮初中級学校)
 Ehime Prefecture
  (四国朝鮮初中級学校)
 Fukuoka Prefecture
 Kyushu Korean Junior-Senior High School (九州朝鮮中高級学校)
  (北九州朝鮮初級学校)
  (福岡朝鮮初級学校)
 Fukushima Prefecture
  (福島朝鮮初中級学校)
 Gifu Prefecture
  (岐阜朝鮮初中級学校)
 Gunma Prefecture
  (群馬朝鮮初中級学校)
 Hiroshima Prefecture
 Hiroshima Korean School (広島朝鮮初中高級学校)
 Hokkaido
 Hokkaido Korean Primary, Middle and High School (北海道朝鮮初中高級学校)
 Hyōgo Prefecture
 Kobe Korean Senior High School (神戸朝鮮高級学校)
  (神戸朝鮮初中級学校)
  (西神戸朝鮮初級学校)
  (尼崎朝鮮初中級学校)
  (伊丹朝鮮初級学校)
  (西播朝鮮初中級学校)
 Ibaraki Prefecture
 Ibaraki Korean Primary, Middle and High School (茨城朝鮮初中高級学校)
 Kanagawa Prefecture
 Kanagawa Korean Jr./ Sr. High School (神奈川朝鮮中高級学校)
  (横浜朝鮮初級学校)
  (鶴見朝鮮初級学校) - Yokohama
  (川崎朝鮮初級学校) - Formerly served junior high school
 Nambu Korean Primary School (南武朝鮮初級学校) - Kawasaki
 Kyoto Prefecture
 Kyoto Korean Junior High-High School (京都朝鮮中高級学校)
  (京都朝鮮初級学校)
  (京都朝鮮第二初級学校) - Formerly served junior high school
 Mie Prefecture
  (四日市朝鮮初中級学校)
 Miyagi Prefecture
 Tohoku Korean Primary and Junior High School (東北朝鮮初中級学校) - Formerly served high school students
 Nagano Prefecture
  (長野朝鮮初中級学校)
 Okayama Prefecture
  (岡山朝鮮初中級学校)
 Okayama Korean Kindergarten (岡山朝鮮幼稚園)
 Osaka Prefecture
  (大阪朝鮮中高級学校)
  (北大阪朝鮮初級学校)
  (生野朝鮮初級学校)
  (南大阪朝鮮初級学校)
  (東大阪朝鮮初級学校)
 Saitama Prefecture
  (埼玉朝鮮初中級学校)
 Shiga Prefecture
  (滋賀朝鮮初級学校)
 Shizuoka Prefecture
  (静岡朝鮮初中級学校)
 Tochigi Prefecture
  (栃木朝鮮初中級学校)
 Tokyo
 Tokyo Korean Junior and Senior High School (東京朝鮮中高級学校)
  (東京朝鮮第一初中級学校)
  (東京朝鮮第二初級学校)
  (東京朝鮮第三初級学校)
  (東京朝鮮第四初中級学校)
  (東京朝鮮第五初中級学校)
  (東京朝鮮第六初級学校)
 Tokyo Korean 9th Elementary School (東京朝鮮第九初級学校)
  (西東京朝鮮第一初中級学校)
  (西東京朝鮮第二初中級学校)
 Wakayama Prefecture
  (和歌山朝鮮初中級学校)
 Yamaguchi Prefecture
  (山口朝鮮初中級学校)

Closed and/or merged schools

 Aichi Prefecture
 Aichi Korean No. 9 Elementary School (愛知朝鮮第九初級学校)
 Fukui Prefecture
  (北陸朝鮮初中級学校)
 Fukuoka Prefecture
  (筑豊朝鮮初級学校)
 Kokura Korean Kindergarten (小倉朝鮮幼稚園) - Kitakyushu
 Gifu Prefecture
  (東濃朝鮮初中級学校) - Toki
 Hyogo Prefecture
  (明石朝鮮初級学校)
  (尼崎東朝鮮初級学校)
  (阪神朝鮮初級学校)
  (宝塚朝鮮初級学校)
 Kyoto Prefecture
  (舞鶴朝鮮初中級学校)
  (京都朝鮮第一初級学校)
  (京都朝鮮第三初級学校) - Merged/renamed to Kyoto Korean Elementary School
 Nara Prefecture
  (奈良朝鮮初級学校)
 Niigata Prefecture
  (新潟朝鮮初中級学校)
 Osaka Prefecture
 Sakai Korean Elementary School (堺朝鮮初級学校)
  (泉州朝鮮初級学校) - Izumiōtsu
  (西大阪朝鮮初級学校)
  (東大阪朝鮮中級学校)
  (中大阪朝鮮初級学校)
  (大阪福島朝鮮初級学校)
  (城北朝鮮初級学校)
  (大阪朝鮮第四初級学校)

 Saitama Prefecture
  (埼玉朝鮮幼稚園)
 Tokyo
 Tokyo No. 8 Korean Elementary School (東京朝鮮第八初級学校)
 Yamaguchi Prefecture
 Yamaguchi Korean High School (山口朝鮮高級学校)
  (下関朝鮮初中級学校)
  (宇部朝鮮初中級学校)
  (徳山朝鮮初中級学校)

See also 

 Our School
 Miscellaneous school - Classification of chōsen gakkō by Japanese authorities

References

Further reading
 Videos
 Asian Boss. "We Visited a Chosun (Ethnic Korean) School in Japan"

Available online:
 Nakajima, Tomoko (中島 智子). "Why Parents Choose Korean Schools : Seeking a Safe Space and/or Reasonable Choice" (朝鮮学校保護者の学校選択理由 : 「安心できる居場所」「当たり前」をもとめて; Archive). Journal of Poole Gakuin University (プール学院大学研究紀要). Poole Gakuin University, 51, 189-202, 2011-12. See profile at CiNii. English abstract available.

Not available online:
 松下 佳弘. "Administrative Measures and Counteractions over the "Total Closure" of Korean Schools between 1949 and 1951 : The Case Study of Aichi Dai-roku Choren Elementary School in Kozakai Town, Hoi Gun" (朝鮮人学校の「完全閉鎖」をめぐる攻防(一九四九~五一年) : 愛知第六朝連小学校(宝飯郡小坂井町)の事例から). 研究紀要 (20), 155-188, 2015-07. 世界人権問題研究センター. See profile at CiNii.

Japan–North Korea relations